Geir Norten Waage (born January 21, 1967) is a Norwegian politician for the Norwegian Labour Party.

Since 2007 he is the mayor of Rana. Waage was one of the four mayors that fronted his municipality and seven others in the Terra Securities scandal.

References

Mayors of places in Nordland
Labour Party (Norway) politicians
Living people
1967 births
Place of birth missing (living people)